John II of Nassau-Saarbrücken (4 April 1423, in Saarbrücken – 15 July 1472, in Vehingen) was a son of Philipp I, Count of Nassau-Weilburg and Elisabeth of Lorraine-Vaudémont. He was Count of Nassau-Saarbrücken from 1429 to 1472.

He married Johanna (1443–1469), a daughter of John IV of Loon.
 Elizabeth (1459–1479), married William IV, Duke of Jülich-Berg in 1472
 Johanna (1464–1521), married John I, Count Palatine of Simmern in 1481.

After Johanna's death, he married Elisabeth, the daughter of Count Louis I of Württemberg-Urach. With her, he had a son:
 John Louis, succeeded as Count of Nassau-Saarbrücken

1423 births
1472 deaths
Burials at Stiftskirche Sankt Arnual (Saarbrücken)